Kozya Sloboda may refer to:
Kozya Sloboda (Kazan) - historical settlement (sloboda) within Kazan
Kozya Sloboda (Kazan Metro) - station of the Kazan Metro